Vasthy E. Mompoint is an American tv/film & theatre actress, singer/songwriter, dancer, voice-over artist, and director/choreographer.

Mompoint, the daughter of Haitian immigrants, grew up in Hoover, Alabama and graduated from Hoover High School in 1998. She has appeared in 8 original Broadway casts: Good Vibrations, Hot Feet, Mary Poppins, Ghost, Soul Doctor, Rocky the Musical, SpongeBob SquarePants (musical) also appearing in the television special on Paramount+, The Prom (musical) and also recreated her role in The Prom (film) on Netflix and served as Associate Choreographer.
Vasthy received the honor of wearing The Legacy Robe (awarded to the cast member with the most Broadway ensemble credits) twice, first during Soul Doctor and then during The Prom (musical). After Vasthy's 8th Broadway show, LaDuca Shoes created a limited edition character shoe inspired by her: The Vasthy. 
Vasthy choreographed films Weird: The Al Yankovic Story on Roku, Cursed Friends on Comedy Central, and recently an episode of Miracle Workers (2019 TV series). 
She completed her television voice acting role as Layla on the 4Kids Entertainment edit of Winx Club and can be heard as the voice of Briny the Whale on Baby Shark's Big Show! on Nickelodean. 
Vasthy runs and owns children's entertainment company: Vasthy & Friends. In 2022, Vasthy released her debut Children's Music album, "Sing, Dance, Play" which can be heard on all music streaming platforms.

Theatre
BroadwaySource: PlaybillFilmography
Film

TelevisionSource: PlaybillDiscographySource: Audius''

References

Sources

External links
 Vasthy Mompoint at Broadway World
 
 Official Facebook page

Year of birth missing (living people)
American film actresses
American musical theatre actresses
American television actresses
American voice actresses
Living people
Actresses from New York City
21st-century American actresses
Place of birth missing (living people)
21st-century American women